Xavier Mabille (3 July 1933 – 24 December 2012) was a Belgian historian and political scientist. He served as President of the Belgium-based Centre de recherche et d'information socio-politiques (CRISP or Centre for Socio-Political Research) in Brussels. In the 1990s, he was a notable political commentator in Belgium. He was born in July 1933 in Anderlecht and died in December 2012 at the age of 79.

References

External links
 CRISP homepage (French)
 CRISP homepage (UK English)

1933 births
2012 deaths
20th-century Belgian historians
Belgian political scientists
Officers of the Ordre national du Mérite